2016–17 SuperLega is the 72nd season of the Italian Championship (highest level of Italian Volleyball League) organized under the supervision of Federazione Italiana Pallavolo. This season is composed of 14 teams, two more than the last season. Biosì Indexa Sora and Tonno Callipo Calabria Vibo Valentia are the new additions to the league.

The Super Cup preceded the regular season on 24-25 September. Azimut Modena won the Super Cup for the second consecutive year.

Super Cup (Pre-season)
Four teams participated in Italian Super Cup. Modena won the tournament defeating Perugia in the final match.
Azimut Modena
Cucine Lube Civitanova
Diatec Trentino
Sir Safety Conad Perugia

Regular season

|}

Play-offs

Quarterfinals
Best-of-three series

|}

|}

|}

|}

Semifinals
Best-of-five series

|}

|}

Finals
Best-of-five series

|}

Final standing

External links
Official website

Men's volleyball competitions in Italy
2016 in Italian sport
2017 in Italian sport
Italy